Murad Zeinulabidov (born October 24, 1990) is a Russian mixed martial artist who competes in the Flyweight division of the ACA. From January 2021 to October 2021, Fight Matrix had him ranked as the #9 flyweight in the world.

Mixed martial arts career

Early career

Starting his career in 2011, Murad compiled a 18–3 record fighting in a variety of regional Russian promotions, such as ACA and Fight Nights Global. Murad also participated in as part of a cultural program organized with the participation of folklore groups from Russia and Portugal. This event was supported by the Federal Agency "Rossotrudnichestvo", which takes part in organizing and holding events of a sports and cultural nature. He won the bout against Hicham Rachid via first-minute anaconda choke, for which he was awarded a letter of gratitude from the Ministry of Foreign Affairs of Russia for his participation in measures to strengthen friendly relations between the two countries.

Absolute Championship Akhmat

Murad made his return to ACA on January 26, 2019 at ACA 91: Agujev vs. Silvério against Ruslan Abiltarov. He won the bout via first round knockout.

Murad faced Rasul Albaskhanov on January 26, 2019 at ACA 104: Goncharov vs. Vakhaev. He won the bout via 2nd round submission.

Murad faced Maycon Silvan on November 6, 2020 at ACA 113: Kerefov vs. Gadzhiev. He won the bout via unanimous decision.

Mixed martial arts record

| Win
| align=center| 21–3
| Maycon Silvan
|  Decision (unanimous)
| ACA 113: Kerefov vs. Gadzhiev
| 
| align=center|3
| align=center|5:00
| Moscow, Russia
|
|-
| Win
| align=center| 20–3
| Rasul Albaskhanov
| Submission (arm-triangle choke)
|ACA 104: Goncharov vs. Vakhaev
|
|align=center|2
|align=center|3:48
|Krasnodar, Russia
|
|-
| Win
| align=center| 19–3
| Ruslan Abiltarov
| KO (punches)
|ACA 91: Agujev vs. Silvério
|
|align=center|1
|align=center|1:13
|Grozny, Russia
| 
|-
| Win
| align=center| 18–3
| Pedro Nobre
| Decision (unanimous)
| WFCA 51: Battle on Volga 4
| 
| align=center| 3
| align=center| 5:00
| Ulyanovsk, Russia
|
|-
| Loss
| align=center| 17–3
| Azam Gaforov
| Decision (unanimous)
| WFCA 45
| 
| align=center| 3
| align=center| 5:00
| Grozny, Russia
|
|-
| Win
| align=center| 17–2
| Dias Erengaipov
| Submission (rear-naked choke)
| Akhmat Fight Show 35
| 
| align=center|1
| align=center|3:25
| Astana, Kazakhstan
| 
|-
| Win
| align=center| 16–2
| Ze Wu
| Submission (brabo choke)
|WLF E.P.I.C. 7
|
|align=center|1
|align=center|2:20
|Zhengzhou, China
|
|-
| Win
| align=center| 15–2
| Hicham Rachid
| Submission (anaconda)
|Showfight 32
|
|align=center|1
|align=center|0:58
|Estoril, Portugal
| 
|-
| Win
| align=center| 14–2
| Shamil Shakhbulatov
| Submission (triangle choke)
| MMA Cup Moscow: Big Final
| 
| align=center| 1
| align=center| 0:56
| Moscow, Russia
| 
|-
| Win
| align=center| 13–2
| Alexey Naumov
| Submission (guillotine choke)
| Fight Nights Global 42
| 
| align=center| 1
| align=center| 1:50
| St. Petersburg, Russia
|
|-
| Win
| align=center| 12–2
| Eldar Tolagatov
| TKO (punches)
| Pankration Cup Of Teberda 2015
| 
| align=center| 2
| align=center| 1:05
| Teberda, Russia
| 
|-
| Loss
| align=center| 11–2
| Filip Macek
| Submission (rear-naked choke)
| ACB 14: Grand Prix 2015
| 
| align=center| 3
| align=center| 0:55
| Grozny, Russia
|
|-
| Win
| align=center|11–1
| Aleksandr Lunga
| Decision (Unanimous)
| New Stream: Russia vs. The World
| 
| align=center| 2
| align=center| 5:00
| Moscow, Russia
|
|-
| Win
| align=center|10–1
| Hasan Atagayev
| Submission (rear-naked choke)
| Sochi Fighting Championship
| 
| align=center|1
| align=center|2:22
| Sochi, Russia
|
|-
| Win
| align=center|9–1
| Mika Hamalainen
| Submission (triangle armbar)
| Helsinki Fight Night
| 
| align=center|1
| align=center|4:07
| Helsinki, Finland
|
|-
| Win
| align=center|8–1
| Ibragim Mazhiev
| Submission (rear-naked choke)
| ACB 4: Grand Prix Berkut 2014
| 
| align=center|1
| align=center|4:11
| Grozny, Russia
|
|-
| Loss
| align=center|7–1
| Sergej Grecicho
| Submission (rear-naked choke)
| Oplot Challenge 86
| 
| align=center| 2
| align=center| 3:41
| Kharkov, Ukraine
|
|-
| Win
| align=center| 7–0
| Maksim Marchenko
| TKO (punches)
| Tech-KREP FC: Battle Of Stars 2
| 
| align=center|1
| align=center|2:00
| Makhachkala, Russia
| 
|-
| Win
| align=center| 6–0
| Vagiz Ismagilov
| Submission (triangle choke)
| ProFC 48: East/West
|
|align=Center|1
|align=center|2:00
|Sterlitamak, Russia
| 
|-
| Win
| align=center| 5–0
| Aidarbek Kabylov
| Decision (Unanimous)
| Pride Of Caucasus 2012
| 
| align=center| 1
| align=center| 2:00
| Khasavyurt, Russia
| 
|-
| Win
| align=center| 4–0
| Yuri Svincov
| TKO (punches)
| Derbent FC 3
| 
| align=center| 1
| align=center| 0:49
| Magaramkent, Russia
| 
|-
| Win
| align=center| 3–0
| Asker Baragunov
| Submission (choke)
| WBO: Pirog vs. Ishida
| 
| align=center| 2
| align=center| 0:41
| Moscow, Russia
| 
|-
| Win
| align=center| 2–0
| Aleksandr Lunga
| KO (punch)
| WMMAF: WMAC 2011 Finals
| 
| align=center| 1
| align=center| 0:24
| Yalta, Ukraine
|
|-
| Win
| align=center| 1–0
| Vartan Asatryan
| Submission (triangle choke)
| WMMAF: WMAC 2011 Semifinals
| 
| align=center| 1
| align=center| 0:00
| Yalta, Ukraine
|

See also 
 List of current ACA fighters
 List of male mixed martial artists

References

External links 
   

1990 births
Living people
Russian male mixed martial artists
Dagestani mixed martial artists
Flyweight mixed martial artists
Sportspeople from Dagestan